Oleksandr Zotov (born 23 February 1975) is a retired professional Ukrainian football midfielder.

Career
Zotov is a product of UOR Donetsk. His professional debut, he made in lower leagues clubs from Donetsk Oblast where he played in 1992–1994. In 1994 Zotov moved to Odessa where he for short period played for the city team SC Odesa. In 1995 he debuted at Vyshcha Liha (Ukrainian Top League) playing for FC Chornomorets Odesa and later FC Kryvbas Kryvyi Rih.

In 2001 Zotov joined Metalurh Donetsk. Later he rejoined Metalurh Donetsk at the beginning of the 2008–09 from Chornomorets Odessa during the summer transfer season.

External links 
Profile on Official Metalurh Donetsk Website
Profile on Football Squads

1975 births
Living people
People from Yenakiieve
Ukrainian footballers
Ukrainian Premier League players
FC Khartsyzk players
FC Metalurh Kostiantynivka players
FC Metalurh Donetsk players
FC Metalurh-2 Donetsk players
FC Kryvbas Kryvyi Rih players
FC Chornomorets Odesa players
SC Odesa players
FC Vorskla Poltava players
FC Vorskla-2 Poltava players
FC Hoverla Uzhhorod players
FC Feniks-Illichovets Kalinine players
Ukraine international footballers
Ukraine under-21 international footballers
Ukrainian football managers
NK Veres Rivne managers
Association football midfielders
Sportspeople from Donetsk Oblast